Lars Andersson (born 1964) is a Swedish politician and MP in the Riksdag for the Sweden Democrats party.

Andersson graduated with a degree in business administration from Oklahoma State University in 1984. He then lived and worked in the United States for an export company before returning to Sweden in 2009 to work for an IT firm. Andersson was elected to the Riksdag in 2018 for the Skåne County constituency and takes seat 154 in parliament. He serves on the Committee on Industry and Finance Committee.

References 

1964 births
Living people
Members of the Riksdag 2018–2022
Members of the Riksdag from the Sweden Democrats
Members of the Riksdag 2022–2026
21st-century Swedish politicians